The 2005 Sony HD 500 was a NASCAR Nextel Cup Series stock car race held on September 4, 2005 at California Speedway in Fontana, California. Contested over 250 laps on the 2-mile (3.23 km) asphalt D-shaped oval, it was the twenty-fifth race of the 2005 Nextel Cup Series season. The race was extended to 254 laps because of a green-white-checker finish.

Kyle Busch of Hendrick Motorsports won the race for the first time in his career and also became the youngest Cup Series race winner until the 2009 Lenox Industrial Tools 301. Carl Edwards would earn his first pole position during qualifying.

Entry list

Practice

Top 10 practice 1 results

Top 10 practice 2 results

Qualifying

Results

Race Statistics
 Time of race: 3:43:32
 Average Speed: 
 Pole Speed: 185.061
 Cautions: 11 for 43 laps
 Margin of Victory: 0.554 sec
 Lead changes: 30
 Percent of race run under caution: 16.9%         
 Average green flag run: 17.6 laps

References 

Sony HD 500
Sony HD 500
NASCAR races at Auto Club Speedway